is a Japanese actress, formerly a child actress, and tarento from Saitama Prefecture affiliated with Amuse, Inc.

Kanno graduated from Hosei University Faculty of Sustainability Studies.

Filmography

Films

TV Drama

References

External links
Official profile
Rio Kanno - Oricon celebrity dictionary

1993 births
Living people
Actors from Saitama Prefecture
Amuse Inc. talents
20th-century Japanese actresses
21st-century Japanese actresses
Japanese film actresses
Japanese television actresses